Lewis Muhlenberg Haupt (March 21, 1844 – March 10, 1937) was a United States civil engineer.  His career emphasized work on waterways.

Biography
Lewis M. Haupt was born in Gettysburg, Pennsylvania on March 21, 1844. His parents were railroad engineer Herman Haupt and Ann Cecilia Keller. He attended the University of Pennsylvania (UPenn) as a freshman for the 1861/1862 academic year. He continued his undergraduate education at the Lawrence Scientific School of Harvard University, and finally graduated from the United States Military Academy at West Point, New York, in 1867. After graduation, he served as a lieutenant in the United States Army Corps of Engineers, 1868-1869. He worked on lake surveys and as engineer officer for the 5th military district of Texas. He resigned from the Corps in August 1869.

After his Corps service, Haupt worked as a topographic engineer at Fairmount Park in Philadelphia, Pennsylvania. He spent a short time working in the United States Patent Office as a patent examiner, and then joined the faculty of UPenn as an instructor in mathematics and engineering in September 1872. He quickly became an assistant professor in 1873, becoming full professor in 1875, and remaining on the faculty until 1892. On June 26, 1873, he married Isabella Christiana Cromwell. They had five children. In 1878, he was elected as a member to the American Philosophical Society. In 1885–1886, he edited the American Engineering Register.

In 1897, President William McKinley appointed him to the Nicaraguan Canal Commission, which studied the possibility of a canal connecting the Atlantic and Pacific Oceans.  A route through Panama was finally selected, and Haupt was appointed to the Panama Canal Commission. He was president of the Colombia-Canea Arbitration (1897), and was chief engineer of the survey for ship canals across New Jersey, and was consulting engineer on the construction of the Ohio-Lake Erie ship canal.

In April 1886, Haupt patented an automatic system for improving rivers and harbors, and for maintaining channels by an adjustable deflecting shield, suspended by buoys, floats, or barges. He patented devices for reclaiming eroded beaches (1911) which were installed in New Jersey and New York. He also invented a "Reaction Breakwater" for creating channels through ocean bars.

He died in Cynwyd, Pennsylvania on March 10, 1937.

Writings
 Engineering Specifications and Contracts (Philadelphia, 1878)
 Working Drawings and How to Make and Use Them (Philadelphia, 1881)
 The Topographer — his Methods and Instruments (Philadelphia, 1884)
 Physical Phenomena of Harbor Entrances (1887)
 Canals and Their Economic Relation to Transportation (1890)
 A Move for Better Roads (1891)
 The Transportation Crisis
 The Nation and the Waterways
 Mississippi River Problems
 The New York Entrance
He also wrote many other pamphlets and contributions to engineering journals.

Notes

References
 
 
 
 

1844 births
1937 deaths
American civil engineers
United States Military Academy alumni
University of Pennsylvania faculty
People from Gettysburg, Pennsylvania
Harvard School of Engineering and Applied Sciences alumni
19th-century American inventors
20th-century American inventors
Engineers from Pennsylvania
Military personnel from Pennsylvania